Ferchardus may refer to:

 Ferchardus I (622?–636?), 52nd king of Scottish Dalriada
Ferchardus II (died 697), 54th king of Scottish Dalriada